The Battle of Wilson's Creek, also known as the Battle of Oak Hills, was the first major battle of the Trans-Mississippi Theater of the American Civil War. It was fought on August 10, 1861, near Springfield, Missouri. 
Missouri was officially a neutral state, but its governor, Claiborne Fox Jackson, supported the South and secretly collaborated with Confederate troops.

In August, Confederates under Brigadier General Benjamin McCulloch and Missouri State Guard troops under Maj. Gen. Sterling Price approached Brig. Gen. Nathaniel Lyon's Army of the West, camped at Springfield. Confederate cavalry received the first blow and retreated from the high ground. Confederate infantry attacked the Union forces three times during the day but failed to break through. Eventually, Sigel's column was driven back to Springfield, allowing the Confederates to consolidate their forces against Lyon's main column. When Lyon was killed and General Thomas William Sweeny wounded, Major Samuel D. Sturgis assumed command of the Union forces. When Sturgis realized that his men were exhausted and lacking ammunition, he ordered a retreat to Springfield. The battle was reckoned as a Confederate victory, but the Confederates were too disorganized and ill-equipped to pursue the retreating Union forces.

Although the state remained in the Union for the remainder of the war, the battle effectively gave the Confederates control of southwestern Missouri.  The victory at Wilson's Creek also allowed Price to lead the Missouri State Guard north in a campaign culminating at the siege of Lexington, Missouri.

Background

Military and political situation 

At the beginning of the American Civil War, Missouri declared that it would be an "armed neutral" in the conflict, and not send materials or men to either side. On April 20, a secessionist mob seized the arsenal in Liberty, Missouri, increasing Union concerns in the state. The neutrality was put to a major test on May 10, in what became known as the Camp Jackson Affair. Governor Claiborne F. Jackson had called out the Missouri Volunteer Militia (MVM) to drill on the edge of St. Louis in Lindell Grove. The governor had clandestinely obtained artillery from the Confederacy and smuggled the pieces into the militia encampment – referred to as "Camp Jackson". Capt. Nathaniel Lyon was aware of this shipment and was concerned the militia would move on the St. Louis Arsenal. Thomas W. Sweeny was put in command of the arsenal's defense, and Lyon surrounded the militia camp with Union troops and home guards, forcing the surrender of the militia. When he marched the prisoners through the streets to the arsenal, some angry members of the crowd began to press against the procession. Taunts and jostling eventually led to gunfire and many deaths.  Most of the dead were civilians, but several soldiers and members of the militia were also killed.

A day later, the Missouri General Assembly created the Missouri State Guard (replacing the MVM) theoretically to defend the state from attacks by perceived enemies on either side of the war. The governor appointed Sterling Price as the commander with the rank of major general of state forces. The state guard was divided into divisions, with each division consisting of units raised from a military district of Missouri and commanded by a brigadier general. Because many of the organization's recruiting areas were behind Union lines, many divisions were the size of a brigade, consisting of only a few regiments. Fearing Missouri's tilt to the South, William S. Harney, the Federal commander of the U.S. Army's Department of the West (which included Missouri) negotiated the Price-Harney Truce on May 12, which nominally created cooperation between the U.S. Army and the MSG to maintain order in Missouri and protect it from outside interference. Jackson publicly declared his support for the truce, while secretly requesting that Confederate forces enter Missouri to "liberate" Missouri from Federal control. 

After complaints by Missouri Unionists, Harney was replaced by Lyon (who was promoted to brigadier general of volunteers), further undermining the fragile truce. On June 12, Lyon and Jackson met at the St. Louis' Planter's House Hotel in a last attempt to avoid a resumption of fighting. Both sides were inflexible, with Lyon demanding the right to inspect any area of the state for Confederate intervention, and Jackson refusing and demanding that Federal forces be restricted to the St. Louis metropolitan area. Colonel Snead, the only surviving witness to that meeting, stated that the meeting ended with Lyon reportedly saying:
...rather than concede to the State of Missouri for one single instant the right to dictate to my Government in any matter however unimportant, I would see you, and you, and you, and every man, woman, and child in the State, dead and buried. This means war. In an hour one of my officers will call for you and conduct you out of my lines.
Lyon sent a force under Sweeney to Springfield while his own forces quickly captured the capital and pursued Jackson, Price, and the now-exiled state government across Missouri. Skirmishes followed, including the Battle of Boonville on June 17 and the Battle of Carthage on July 5. In light of the crisis, the delegates of the Missouri Constitutional Convention that had rejected secession in February reconvened. On July 27, the convention declared the governor's office vacant and selected Hamilton Rowan Gamble to be the new provisional governor.

By July 13, Lyon's army of approximately 5,430 men was encamped at Springfield. His force was composed of the 1st, 2nd, 3rd, and 5th Missouri infantry, the 1st Iowa Infantry, the 1st and 2nd Kansas infantry, as well as several companies of regular army infantry and cavalry and three batteries of artillery. He divided the units into four brigades commanded by Major Samuel D. Sturgis, Colonel Franz Sigel, Lieutenant Colonel George Andrews, and Colonel George Dietzler.

Price and McCulloch developed plans to attack Springfield, but Lyon marched out of the city on August 1 in an attempt to surprise the Southern forces. The armies' vanguards skirmished at Dug Springs, Missouri on August 2. The Union force emerged as the victor, but Lyon learned he was outnumbered by more than two-to-one and retreated back to Springfield. McCulloch, now in command of the Missourian army, gave chase. Price favored an immediate attack on Springfield but McCulloch, doubtful about the quality of the Missouri State Guard, preferred to remain in place. After Price threatened to launch an attack without his support, McCulloch agreed to an attack at dawn on the 10th but when a rainstorm started during the evening of the ninth, he canceled his plans and ordered his troops back to camp.

Outnumbered, Lyon planned to withdraw northeast to Rolla to reinforce and resupply, but not before launching a surprise attack on the Missourian camp to delay pursuit. Sigel proposed striking McCullough in a pincer movement, which would split the already outnumbered Union force; he planned to lead 1,200 men in a flanking maneuver while the main body under Lyon struck from the north. Lyon concurred, and in accord with Sigel's plan, the Union army marched out of Springfield on the rainy night of August 9, leaving about 1,000 men to protect supplies and cover the retreat.

Opposing forces

Union

Confederate

Battle 

At first light on the morning of August 10, the Union began a surprise attack on the opposing forces. Lyon's force overran the enemy camps and took the high ground at the crest of a ridge, which would become known as "Bloody Hill". Early Union hopes for a rout were dashed, however, when the artillery of the Pulaski Arkansas Battery unlimbered and checked the advance, which gave Price's infantry time and cover to organize lines on the south slope of the hill. Lyon organized a line on the southern slope of Bloody Hill, from which he launched an unsuccessful counterattack. Price launched a series of frontal and flank attacks but was also unsuccessful; a shortage of ammunition in the Confederate army was a factor in the Confederate defeats.

The two Union forces lost contact with each other, with no means of communicating or supporting each other if anything went wrong. Sigel's attack was successful at first; the brigade arrived in the Confederate rear soon after dawn. Artillery fire routed the Confederate cavalry units, which were encamped at Sharp's farm. Sigel began a pursuit, but stopped along Skegg's Branch. During the break, he failed to post skirmishers, leaving his left flank open for an attack. Meanwhile, McCulloch rallied several Confederate units, including the 3rd Louisiana Infantry and the 3rd Division from the Missouri State Guard, to lead a counterattack. Sigel's men mistook the 3rd Louisiana for the 1st Iowa Infantry (which also wore gray uniforms) and withheld their fire until the Confederates were nearly upon them. His flank was consequently devastated by the counterattack, and his brigade was routed, losing four cannons. Sigel and his men fled the field, leaving the force under Lyon, Sweeny, and Sturgis holding out alone.

With the rout of Sigel's flank, the momentum of the battle shifted in the South's favor. Lyon was wounded twice, and worried that "the day was lost", he attempted to lead a counterattack.  However, Lyon was shot in the heart, and the charge fell apart after his death. Lyon became the first Union general to be killed in the war. General Sweeny was shot in the leg, and Major Sturgis, as the highest ranking Regular Army officer, assumed command of the Union army. Despite still being in a defensible position atop the hill, Union supplies were low and morale was worsening. By 11:00 a.m., the Union forces had already repulsed three separate Confederate charges. Ammunition and men were nearly exhausted, and Sturgis retreated rather than risk a fourth Confederate attack. Henry Clay Wood, in command of a company that helped cover the retreat, later received the Medal of Honor for the heroism he displayed in keeping his company organized and functioning as it left the battlefield.

Aftermath 
The casualties were about equal on both sides – around 1,317 Union and an estimated 1,232 Confederate/Missourian/Arkansan soldiers were either killed, wounded, or captured. Though the Confederate force won the field, they were unable to pursue the retreating Union forces to Rolla. Price wanted to start a pursuit of the Union force immediately, but McCulloch refused, worried about the quality of the Missouri State Guard and the length of his supply line back to Arkansas. With the victory, Price's Missouri Guard began an invasion of northern Missouri that culminated in the First Battle of Lexington on September 20. The Confederate and Arkansas forces withdrew from the state.

After falling back to Springfield, Sturgis handed command of the Union army over to Sigel. At a council of war that evening, it was agreed that the army had to fall back to Rolla, beginning at 3 a.m. the next morning. However, Sigel failed to get his brigade ready at that time, forcing a delay of several hours. Along the retreat route, Sigel's men took several lengthy delays to prepare meals; this caused the other officers to force Sigel to turn command back over to Sturgis.

On October 30, the Missourians under Price and Jackson formally joined the Confederate cause in Neosho, Missouri. A rump of the Missouri State Assembly meeting in Neosho passed the resolutions for Missouri secession and Jackson became (nominally) the Governor of Confederate Missouri (Jackson had never accepted his July removal from office by the State Convention). However, the secession action was never accepted by most of the population of Missouri, and the state remained in the Union throughout the war. What little control Price and Jackson did have was diminished by Confederate reverses during the Battles of Fredericktown on October 21 and the First Battle of Springfield on October 25. The Confederate state government was soon forced to leave the state. Although Price enjoyed some Missouri victories, notably the siege and capture of Lexington, he did not have the popular support to remain in the field, eventually retreating to northwest Arkansas. After 1861, he was commissioned as a Confederate Major General and led his forces in battles in Arkansas and Mississippi. While there were smaller incursions and skirmishes in Missouri, Price did not return to Missouri with a major force until 1864. Nevertheless, Missouri suffered extensive guerrilla warfare between Unionists and pro-Confederate bushwhackers such as Quantrill's Raiders and Bloody Bill Anderson throughout the war.

By early 1862, Federal forces had effectively pushed Price out of Missouri. An army under Union general Samuel Ryan Curtis pursued Price into Arkansas, where General Earl Van Dorn assumed command of combined forces led by Price and McCulloch. Outnumbered, Curtis nonetheless defeated Van Dorn's Confederate Army of the West at the Battle of Pea Ridge on March 6–8, ending any attempt by a major Confederate force to occupy Missouri until Price's Raid in 1864.

The Battle of Wilson's Creek was the first major battle fought west of the Mississippi River. The battle was known as the Battle of Oak Hills in the Confederacy, and is sometimes called the "Bull Run of the West".

Battlefield preservation 

The site of the battle has been protected as Wilson's Creek National Battlefield. The National Park Service operates a visitor center featuring exhibits, a fiber optic map displaying the course of the battle, and a research library. Living history programs depicting various aspects of the soldier's experience of that area are presented on weekends seasonally. With the exception of the vegetation and the addition of interpretive hiking trails and a self-guided auto tour route, the  battlefield has changed little from its historic setting, allowing visitors to experience the battlefield in nearly pristine condition. The home of the Ray family, which served as a Confederate field hospital during the battle, has been preserved and represents one of only two structures in existence during the battle to still be extant on the park today (the other being a springhouse). In addition, the American Battlefield Trust has preserved  of the Wilson's Creek battlefield.

See also 

 List of costliest American Civil War land battles
 Troop engagements of the American Civil War, 1861
 Frémont Emancipation
 Missouri in the American Civil War

Notes

References 

 
 
 
 
 
 
 U.S. War Department, The War of the Rebellion: a Compilation of the Official Records of the Union and Confederate Armies. Washington, DC: U.S. Government Printing Office, 1880–1901.

Further reading

External links

 Battle of Wilson's Creek at American Battlefield Trust
 Battle of Wilson's Creek at Community & Conflict: The Impact of the Civil War in the Ozarks
 

1861 in the American Civil War
1861 in Missouri
August 1861 events
Battles of the American Civil War in Missouri
Battles of the Trans-Mississippi Theater of the American Civil War
Christian County, Missouri
Confederate victories of the American Civil War
History of Greene County, Missouri
Operations to control Missouri (American Civil War)